Alfundão is a former civil parish in the municipality of Ferreira do Alentejo, Portugal. In 2013, the parish merged into the new parish Alfundão e Peroguarda.

Alfundão has an area of 51.96 km2 and 863 inhabitants (2011). Its population density was 16.6 inhab / km2. At the eastern end of Ferreira do Alentejo, Alfundão delimits this municipality from those of Cuba and Beja.

It was the seat of an extinct parish in 2013, as part of a national administrative reform, to form, together with Peroguarda, a new parish called União das Freguesia de Alfundão and Peroguarda of which it is the headquarters.

References

Former parishes of Ferreira do Alentejo